Skylanders: Imaginators is a 2016 toys-to-life 3D platform game developed by Toys for Bob and published by Activision. A successor to Skylanders: SuperChargers, it was released for Nintendo Switch, PlayStation 3, PlayStation 4, Wii U, Xbox 360 and Xbox One. For the first time in the series, players can create their own characters, known as Imaginators. The game received generally positive reviews but the title's sales were below Activision's expectations. It is the sixth and most recent Skylanders game released on consoles.

Plot 
In the past, the ancients used powerful Mind Magic to conjure and create anything they could think of. However, one of the Ancients, known as Brain, tried to use Mind Magic to brainwash all of Skylands, so the ancients sealed him away, and sealed away the power of Mind Magic so evil could not use it.

Following the events of the last game, there has been an era of peace. However, a mysterious being soon steals a book from the Skylanders Academy, and is soon revealed to work for Kaos, who seeks to use the power of Mind Magic to create an army of Doomlanders to conquer Skylands. However, his constructs prove feeble and erratic, leading him to seek the aid of Brain, the last remaining Ancient. With this, he becomes more capable, but still remains unable to defeat the player, so they instead decide to brainwash all of Skylands and protect their fortress with an impenetrable force field, leaving only Spyro immune because of his dragon body. They are able to free the Skylands from the brainwash, and trick Kaos into letting them in. In the final battle, Kaos powers into a more powerful form summoning various Doomlanders to aid him but Brain, frustrated at Kaos' low intelligence and insults, betrays him and fights alongside the player. When Kaos is defeated, Brain tries to run, but works alongside the Skylanders under the threat of being sealed away again, and shrinks Kaos and Glumshanks, with the game ending before he starts to tell a tale.

Gameplay 
Similar to its predecessors, the core gameplay revolves around solving puzzles, platforming, and fighting enemies. As the title is a toys-to-life game, players can put Skylanders toy figurine onto a Portal of Power, which will then allow players to control the figurine-represented character in-game. Creation Clash, a remake of Skystones which was introduced in Giants is featured in the game. The game supports local multiplayer.

One of the newest additions are "Imaginators", which are characters created by the player. At the beginning of the game, players can select a battle class (Knight, Smasher, Sentinel, Swashbuckler, Brawler, Sorcerer, Quickshot, Ninja, Bazooker, and Bowslinger) and elemental class (The ten elements of the Skylanders series), which determines their fighting style. While the battle class cannot be reset within the game itself, unofficial methods exist to completely reset the Creation Crystal via the use of older Skylanders games on the Wii and Nintendo 3DS. Afterwards, players can customize the names, voices, fighting abilities, appearances, colors and sizes of their Imaginators. For players who do not wish to create a new character, they can use a mechanic that automatically generates an Imaginators randomly, or use any existing Skylanders featured in its predecessors. The Imaginators created can be shared to other players. Body parts, which are classified into four types, namely Common, Rare, Epic, and Ultimate, can be found when players are exploring in the game. These new parts can be used to customize the player's existing Imaginators, which can be modified at any time. Creation Crystals are where the Imaginators are stored. With the crystal, players can transport their custom Imaginatiors to all video game consoles the game is released for. In addition to Imaginators, the game also adds 31 more typical Skylanders into the game. These new characters are called "Senseis", and they are extremely powerful, as they are extremely refined in their respective classes. 11 of these Senseis are villains who had appeared in previous Skylanders games. They also have the ability to perform a special attack called "Sky Chi". These Senseis lead the Imaginators, and involve in helping them to unlock their abilities, techniques, weapons, and level-cap. Senseis are optional, and players can complete the game without using them.

Both Crash Bandicoot and Doctor Neo Cortex appear as guest characters with their own level, Thumpin' Wumpa Islands. This level has iconic gameplay features present in previous Crash Bandicoot games.

Development 
Development of the game began after the completion of Skylanders: Trap Team, and the game's development cycle is approximately two years. With SuperChargers not being a commercial success, and Disney's decision to shut down its own toys-to-life developer Avalanche Software and its franchise, Disney Infinity, Activision, which had grossed $3 billion with the franchise, remained hopeful and believed that the genre still has potential for continuous game development. As the game's target audience is kids, many development team members suggested ideas to their own children to see whether they resonate with them, and pitched these ideas to other members to see whether their children are equally interested in order to ensure that these gameplay ideas appeal to them.

According to Jeff Poffenbarger, the senior executive producer of Imaginators, innovation is one of the most important aspects while designing the game. They hoped that with new mechanics and systems, they can continue to attract new customers to play the game, as well as retaining the core players. In addition, according to CEO Eric Hirshberg, one of the advantages is that Skylanders, unlike its competitors, features largely original characters and would not be confined to any limitation. The Imaginators mechanic was the most significant introduction, and was designed to be similar to other complex role-playing games. However, one of the key principles is to retain its accessibility. They hoped that players can make use of their creativity to create unique Skylanders, and that the team "can’t wait to see what people create". This mechanic was inspired by a fan letter after the release of Skylanders: Spyro's Adventure. Selected player-created Imaginators had been printed out through 3D printers by the Skylanders team. As this creation mechanic introduced many new characters, the team decided to create a story that puts a huge emphasis on existing characters, so that these characters would remain relevant to the franchise.

In February 2016, Activision confirmed that there would be a new Skylanders title set to be released in 2016. The game was officially revealed on June 1, 2016. Imaginators was released for PlayStation 3, PlayStation 4, Wii U, Xbox 360 and Xbox One in October 2016. The team opted not to port the game for mobile platforms as the team realized that there is not a huge demand or market for toys-to-life games in these platforms. The developers have also decided not to make a Wii or 3DS version, unlike in previous titles, possibly due to this particular game's technical limitations. A Dark Edition, which costs more than the standard edition, was released alongside the game. It adds several cosmetic designs to the Senseis, and added three more Creation Crystals. A digital Starter's Pack would not return, as the team thought that physical toys should be a key part of the game.

In June 2016, Sony Interactive Entertainment revealed that Crash Bandicoot would be a new guest character in the game. His level and character include designs created by veteran Skylanders developer, Vicarious Visions. To create an accurate version of Crash, the team studied old documents of the old games, including the original concepts. As Crash has his own physical figure, the team went through multiple design iterations to ensure that they had successfully captured his personality, and that its final pose and appearance are cohesive with his old version. The team began animating Crash after finishing up the model, with the goal of ensuring that Crash's "edginess, trademark wackiness, and swagger" are preserved. To capture Crash's legacy, the team specifically created a new life system, spin attack mechanic for it, and numerous crates for the level based on his setting. Imaginators marked the first major appearance of Crash in several years; though he had a cameo appearance in Uncharted 4: A Thief's End, the last game in which he was the main character was 2010's Crash Bandicoot Nitro Kart 2. In August 2016, at Gamescom, it was announced the game would also feature Crash Bandicoot series antagonist Doctor Neo Cortex as a playable character, along with an additional level featuring gameplay and design elements derived from the Crash series.

Following the Nintendo Switch Presentation on January 13, 2017, Activision announced that Skylanders: Imaginators would be released on the console as a launch title. Due to the Nintendo Switch version not supporting previous Portals of Power, the version would not support Traps and Vehicles introduced to Skylanders: Trap Team and Skylanders: SuperChargers respectively (although the Vehicles can still be scanned to unlock one free Imaginite Chest each).

Reception 

Skylanders: Imaginators received "generally favorable" reviews for most platforms according to review aggregator Metacritic; the Nintendo Switch version received "mixed or average" reviews. Despite the generally positive reception, the game sold only 66,000 copies during its launch month.

References

External links 
 

2016 video games
Activision games
Cooperative video games
Multiplayer and single-player video games
Nintendo Network games
Nintendo Switch games
Platform games
PlayStation 3 games
PlayStation 4 games
Crash Bandicoot games
Crossover role-playing video games
Science fantasy video games
Spyro the Dragon video games
Wii U games
Xbox 360 games
Xbox One games
Toys-to-life games
Superhero video games
Video games scored by Lorne Balfe
3D platform games
Toys for Bob games
Video games developed in the United States
Imaginators